Emily Berquist Soule (born Washington, D.C.) is a historian of Colonial Latin America
and the Spanish Empire.

Life 
She grew up in Stratford, Connecticut and attended Vassar College, where she studied under James H. Merrell and graduated cum laude in History and Hispanic Studies. She studied Colonial Latin American History at the University of Texas at Austin, earning her Ph.D. there in 2007, studying under Jorge Cañizares-Esguerra and Susan Deans-Smith, among others. She is presently  Professor of History at California State University, Long Beach, where she teaches courses on Colonial Latin America, with a special focus  on the Atlantic Slave Trade, revolutions, visual culture, and religion. In 2013, she appeared as a historical consultant on the Travel Channel artifact hunting show "Digfellas."

In March 2014, her first book, The Bishop's Utopia: Envisioning Improvement in Colonial Peru, was published by the University of Pennsylvania Press, as part of the "Early Modern Americas" series, edited by Peter Mancall.

Her second book-in-progress, The Atlantic Slave Trade and the Rise and Fall of the Spanish Empireis under contract with Yale University Press. 
Starting in January 2023, she will join the team of Editors at Atlantic Studies: Global Currents, where she will be overseeing submissions and content focusing on Latin America and Africa.

Awards (selected) 
2019-2020 Fletcher Jones Foundation Fellowship, Huntington Library
2014-2015 National Endowment for the Humanities Faculty Award
2010-2011 American Council of Learned Societies Fellowship
2010-2011 Dibner Fellowship in the History of Science, Huntington Library
2003-2004 Fulbright Fellowship

Works 
 The Bishop's Utopia: Envisioning Improvement in Colonial Peru, University of Pennsylvania Press, 2014, "The Early Modern Americas" series, edited by Peter C. Mancall 
 “Early Antislavery Sentiment in the Spanish Atlantic World, 1765-1817,” Slavery & Abolition 31, no. 2 (June 2010): 181-207
 “Bishop Martínez Compañón’s Practical Utopia in Enlightenment Peru,” The Americas: A Quarterly Review of Inter-American Cultural History 64, no. 3 (January 2008): 377-408

References

External links 
 Faculty page at California State University, Long Beach
 Inside CSULB: NEH Grant Aids Berquist's Research

Year of birth missing (living people)
Living people
Writers from Washington, D.C.
Historians of colonialism
Historians of Peru
Historians of Latin America
Vassar College alumni
University of Texas at Austin College of Liberal Arts alumni
California State University, Long Beach faculty
American women historians
People from Stratford, Connecticut
21st-century American historians
21st-century American women writers
Historians from Connecticut